The Deputy Governor of the British Virgin Islands is the highest administrative post to be held by a British Virgin Islander. The position was established in 1977. 

The incumbent Deputy Governor is empowered under a dormant commission to be the acting Governor of the British Virgin Islands when there is a vacancy in that office - and can also act as Governor when the Governor is either ill or temporarily absent from the British Virgin Islands.

Below is a list of office-holders:

Footnotes

See also
Premier of the Virgin Islands

Sources
The Deputy Governor's Office

1977 establishments in the British Virgin Islands

Government of the British Virgin Islands